Tom Patchett is an American film director, screenwriter, actor and producer who is best known as the co-creator of ALF. He co-wrote the films Up the Academy, The Great Muppet Caper, The Muppets Take Manhattan, and Project ALF. He also wrote episodes of The Bob Newhart Show, We've Got Each Other, The Tony Randall Show, The Carol Burnett Show, and Buffalo Bill.

References

External links

Living people
American male film actors
American male television actors
American television writers
American film directors
American male screenwriters
American male television writers
Year of birth missing (living people)